Mississippi Highway 583 (MS 583) is a state highway in southern Mississippi that runs just under  in length. The road was designated in 1956 and runs from MS 27 in Tylertown to MS 184 in Brookhaven.

Route description

The highway begins at the intersection of MS 27 (Tyler Avenue to the south, Union Road to the north) and Tyler Avenue north of the central business district of Tylertown, but still within the town limits. MS 583 heads northwest along Tyler Avenue first intersecting U.S. Route 98 (US 98) at a signalized intersection. The two-lane road continues northwest out of town heading through wooded and rural areas of Walthall County. Some farm fields, churches, and a pipeline pump station.

At the Walthall–Lawrence county line, MS 44 breaks off the concurrency leaving MS 583 to head northwest. MS 583 travels through Lawrence County for about  before entering Lincoln County. At Ruth, the highway meets the former MS 591. The highway makes a more northerly course passing Enterprise High School. MS 583 meets US 84. After MS 583 breaks off the concurrency, the state highway heads north along South First Street. Just north of its intersection owith Dale Trail NE, state maintenance ends along MS 583. The road is maintained by the county and is surrounded by a large field on its west side and small houses on the east. As it enters the city of Brookhaven, more houses and businesses surround the road. The state highway officially ends at MS 184 (Monticello Street) though at this point, South First Street is only signed as "To MS 583."

History
MS 583 was first designated in 1956 running generally along its current Tylertown–Brookhaven alignment as it does today. A slight change in 1977 occurred when the four-lane US 84 bypass of Brookhaven was completed. MS 583 was moved from the two-lane Greenview Trail to the new four-lane divided bypass.

Major intersections

References

External links

583
Transportation in Walthall County, Mississippi
Transportation in Lawrence County, Mississippi
Transportation in Lincoln County, Mississippi